We Are the Air is the first full-length album by the band Josephine Collective. It was digitally released on June 24, 2008 on Warner Bros. Records. The album was recorded and produced by John Feldmann in three sessions from February 2006 to October 2007. Title track, We are The Air recorded and produced by Brandon Paddock at Covenant Studios in Kansas City, Missouri

Track listing
"Living" – 3:14  
"Crack My Heart" – 3:49  
"Lye" – 2:57  
"We Killed the American Dream" 3:42 
"Clementine" – 3:18 
"Scarlet" – 3:26 
"Leave Me Love" – 3:32    
"It's Like Rain" – 4:06    
"Ivy League" – 3:43     
"Let Go" – 3:39    
"Pray For Rain" – 3:42     
"We Are The Air" – 5:50

2008 debut albums
Albums produced by John Feldmann